Ed Chamberlain (born 8 February 1996) is an Ireland international rugby league footballer who plays as a  and er for the Leigh Leopards in the Betfred Super League.

Background
Chamberlain was born in Warrington, Cheshire, England.

Career
He has previously played for the Widnes Vikings in the Super League, and on loan from Widnes at Whitehaven and the Bradford Bulls in the Championship, Workington Town in League 1 and Salford in the Super League. Chamberlain has also spent time on loan from Salford at London during the 2019 RFL Championship season.

He has been dual-registered with Whitehaven in the Kingstone Press Championship.

Leigh
On 20 October 2021, it was reported that he had signed for Leigh Centurions in the RFL Championship
On 28 May 2022, Chamberlain played for Leigh in their 2022 RFL 1895 Cup final victory over Featherstone.

International
He was named in the Ireland squad for the 2017 Rugby League World Cup.

References

External links
Salford Red Devils profile
Widnes Vikings profile
SL profile
2017 RLWC profile
Ireland profile

1996 births
Living people
English people of Irish descent
English rugby league players
Ireland national rugby league team players
Leigh Leopards players
London Broncos players
Rugby league fullbacks
Rugby league players from Warrington
Rugby league wingers
Salford Red Devils players
Whitehaven R.L.F.C. players
Widnes Vikings players
Workington Town players